Raymond Dalmau Pérez (born October 27, 1948) is a retired Puerto Rican professional basketball player and coach. Dalmau played in the Baloncesto Superior Nacional (BSN), the top tier basketball league in the country, for 20 seasons with the Piratas de Quebradillas. At the time of his retirement, at the end of the 1985 season, Dalmau was the BSN's all-time leader in points (11,592), rebounds (5,673) and assists (2,302).

Career 
Dalmau grew up in Harlem, New York. From there he came to Puerto Rico for the first time in 1966, recruited by Raymond Burgos to reinforce the Piratas de Quebradillas in the BSN. At that time, players of Puerto Rican descent were recognized as imported into the tournament.

Dalmau had a very immediate impact in the league despite been only 17 years old. In his rookie year he finished second in scoring with an average of 18.4 points and 8.3 rebounds.

In 1968, Dalmau lead the league in scoring. He repeated as scoring champion in 1970, when he won his first championship as a member of the Piratas de Quebradillas. Dalmau, along with other 'Nuyoricans' such as Neftalí Rivera and Néstor Cora in the Piratas team, dominated in the BSN league in the 1970s, reaching the BSN finals eight times and winning the championship on four occasions including back to back to back titles in 1977, 1978 and 1979. He won the BSN Most Valuable Player award three times.

He was in conversations in 1975 to sign a contract with the former Utah Stars in the ABA (American basketball association) but he declined to maintain his amateur status. Professional basketball players were not allowed at that time to play for their countries in international competition.

In 1982, Dalmau and Quebradillas returned to the BSN finals, but they lost to Mario Morales and the Guaynabo Mets in six games.

Dalmau participated in three Summer Olympics. He held the record for the most career points scored in the BSN league when he retired after scoring over 11,000 points in his career. He currently is in fifth place in the all-time scoring list and fourth in the all-time rebounding list of the BSN league.

Throughout his career, he was known not only for his abilities on the court, but also for his competitive spirit, which led him to do his best even when paired against taller and stronger rivals in international competitions.

Retirement and coaching years 
In 1985, Dalmau retired from basketball as a player, going on to coaching in the BSN for many years. He has also coached in Venezuela for a number of years.

He had success as coach for the Puerto Rico national basketball team. He won gold in the 1989 Tournament of the Americas and a fourth place in the 1990 FIBA World Championship.

Personal life 
Dalmau is married to Sandra Ortiz. They have three sons Christian, Richie, and Ricardo, and one daughter, Natalia. All three sons, were played basketball players in the BSN and also were part of the Puerto Rico national team.

In 1993, Dalmau was diagnosed with colon cancer, from which he recuperated. During a 2005 television show where he and Eddie Miró were being introduced as spokesmen in Puerto Rico for colon cancer, he quipped that, at his age, he can still jog everyday from Santurce to past the Luis Muñoz Marín International Airport in Isla Verde, which constitutes a considerable distance (more than five miles). On June 16, 2008, a project was approved by the Puerto Rico House of Representatives, in which Dalmau's name was going to be used for a coliseum being built in Quebradillas.

In popular culture
In the 1996 film Basquiat, Benicio del Toro made a homage to Dalmau by wearing a replica of his Puerto Rico men's national basketball team uniform with his distinctive number (14) fourteen. According to the IMDB, his character Benny's last name is Dalmau.

Dalmau will appear in the forthcoming feature-length documentary film Nuyorican Básquet about Puerto Rico's Men Basketball Squad of the 1979 Pan American Games.

See also 

 List of Puerto Ricans
 Teófilo Cruz
 Mario Morales

References

External links 
 Basketball Reference-Olympic Stats
 Statistics in BSN
 Statistics in BSN from WorldHoopsStats.com
 LexJuris (Leyes y Jurisprudencia) de Puerto Rico
 Career Leaders Per Stats in the Baloncesto Superior Nacional de Puerto Rico
 Sports-Reference
 Gallery of Pictures of Puerto Rican players  at enciclopediapr.org

1948 births
Living people
Puerto Rican people of Catalan descent
Baloncesto Superior Nacional players
Basketball players at the 1967 Pan American Games
Basketball players at the 1968 Summer Olympics
Basketball players at the 1971 Pan American Games
Basketball players at the 1972 Summer Olympics
Basketball players at the 1975 Pan American Games
Basketball players at the 1976 Summer Olympics
Basketball players at the 1979 Pan American Games
BSN coaches
Olympic basketball players of Puerto Rico
Pan American Games medalists in basketball
Pan American Games silver medalists for Puerto Rico
Piratas de Quebradillas players
Puerto Rican men's basketball players
1967 FIBA World Championship players
1974 FIBA World Championship players
1978 FIBA World Championship players
Puerto Rico men's national basketball team players
Sportspeople from San Juan, Puerto Rico
Power forwards (basketball)
Medalists at the 1971 Pan American Games
Medalists at the 1979 Pan American Games
Medalists at the 1975 Pan American Games